Rosecrans Avenue is a major west-east thoroughfare in Los Angeles and Orange Counties, California, USA.  It has a total length of 27.5 miles (44.3 km). The street is named after U.S. Union General William S. Rosecrans, who purchased  of Rancho Sausal Redondo southwest of Los Angeles in 1869.  Rosecrans Avenue was originally named Drexel Avenue, and ran through the Rosecrans Rancho which is part of modern-day Gardena.

Route description

Rosecrans Avenue begins at the beach near El Porto in Manhattan Beach. On its route, it crosses through Manhattan Beach, El Segundo (northside of street only), Hawthorne, Lawndale, Gardena, Harbor Gateway, Willowbrook, Compton, East Rancho Dominguez, Paramount, Downey (for one block between Century Blvd and Lakewood Blvd/SR-19), Bellflower, Norwalk, Santa Fe Springs, La Mirada, Buena Park (southside of street only; Fullerton and La Mirada connect on the northside near Beach Blvd/SR-39), and Fullerton where the road ends at Euclid Street (eastern terminus). It intersects the 405, 110, 710, 605, and 5 freeways (all Interstates). Rosecrans is mostly a straight road until the intersection with Clark Avenue in Bellflower and again at Valley View Avenue in La Mirada when it starts to curve through the West Coyote Hills. Rosecrans enters the cities of Fullerton and Buena Park crossing into Orange County after the intersection with Beach Boulevard. Rosecrans Avenue enters Buena Park approaching Ralph B. Clark Regional Park before entering Fullerton halfway the park (no signs indicate where La Mirada ends and Buena Park begins/ends; there is one for where Fullerton begins on the southside of street).

From Lakewood Boulevard in Downey/Bellflower to Valley View Avenue in Santa Fe Springs/La Mirada, Rosecrans is about one mile south of, and runs parallel to Imperial Highway.

Rosecrans at Maquardt Avenue in Santa Fe Springs has been considered the most hazardous railroad grade crossing in California. BNSF, Amtrak's Pacific Surfliner and Southwest Chief, and Metrolink's Orange County and 91 lines run towards that crossing.

Termini
Western terminus, The Strand in Manhattan Beach: 
Eastern terminus, Euclid Street in Fullerton:

Transportation

Beach Cities Transit line 109 (between Highland Avenue and Sepulveda Boulevard), Metro Local line 125 (between Sepulveda Boulevard and Norwalk Station) and Norwalk Transit line 5 (east of Norwalk Station) operate on Rosecrans Avenue.  The Metro J Line Rosecrans/I-110 station on the Harbor Transitway is located on Interstate 110 below Rosecrans Avenue. At Douglas Street, the Metro C Line serves a station.

In popular culture
Rosecrans Avenue is well-known among hip hop culture for its reputation for violence and crime. The thoroughfare is commonly associated with Compton native Kendrick Lamar, as he often mentions it in numerous songs from his second studio album good kid, m.A.A.d city, in the songs "m.A.A.d city," "The Art of Peer Pressure," and "Compton."

The street is mentioned by Tupac Shakur in "California Love", as well as "Genocide" and “ETA” by Dr. Dre.

Rosecrans is an album by DJ Quik and Problem named after Rosecrans Avenue.

References

Streets in Los Angeles County, California
Streets in Orange County, California
Avenue
Bellflower, California
Buena Park, California
Compton, California
Downey, California
El Segundo, California
Fullerton, California
Gardena, California
Hawthorne, California
La Mirada, California
Lawndale, California
Streets in Los Angeles
Manhattan Beach, California
Norwalk, California
Paramount, California
Santa Fe Springs, California
Willowbrook, California
Grove Street Facts